The Armidale Region is a local government area in the New England and Northern Tablelands regions of New South Wales, Australia. This area was formed in 2016 from the merger of the Armidale Dumaresq Shire with the surrounding Guyra Shire.

The combined area covered the urban area of Armidale and the surrounding region, extending primarily eastward from the city through farming districts to the gorges and escarpments that mark the edge of the Northern Tablelands.

The  Armidale Region is administered by the Armidale Regional Council.

The Mayor of the Armidale Region is Cr. Sam Coupland, an independent politician.

History 
On 1 July 2019, Tingha was transferred from Armidale Region to Inverell Shire.

Towns, villages and other locations 

Oban is a rural  location covering  within the Armidale Regional LGA,  with 7 residents.

Heritage listings
The Armidale Region has a number of heritage-listed sites, including the following sites in Armidale:
 158 Beardy Street: Armidale Post Office
 164 Beardy Street: Commercial Bank of Australia Building
 216 Brown Street: Armidale railway station turntable
 234 Brown Street: Armidale railway station
 125 Dangar Street: Central Park, Armidale
 132 Dangar Street: Saints Mary and Joseph Catholic Cathedral
 108 Faulkner Street: Lands Board Office
 60 Madgwick Drive: Booloominbah
 122-132 Mossman Street: Old Teachers' College
 36 Roseneath Lane: Roseneath
 122 Rusden Street: St Peter's Cathedral
 230 Saumarez Road: Saumarez Homestead
 High Conservation Value Old Growth forest

Demographics

Council
Armidale Regional Council is composed of eleven Councillors elected proportionally as a single ward. All Councillors are elected for a fixed four-year term of office. The Mayor is elected by the Councillors at the first meeting of the Council. The most recent election was held on 4 December 2021, and the makeup of the Council is as follows:

The current Council, elected in 2017, in order of election, is:

See also

 Local government areas of New South Wales

References

External links

 
Local government areas of New South Wales
New England (New South Wales)
2016 establishments in Australia